St. Bartholomew's Episcopal Church, also known as Green Hill Church, is a historic Episcopal church located near Quantico in Wicomico County, Maryland.

History
Stepney Parish, as it was originally named, was one of the original 30 Anglican parishes in the Province of Maryland. It was built originally to serve the needs of Green Hill Town, a port of entry created as part of an Act of Provincial Assembly in 1706. However, the town never succeeded, although nearby Salisbury, Maryland, founded three decades later, for much of the 19th century became Maryland's second busiest port, known for its export of seafood as well as agricultural products. This original Stepney parish church was renamed after the apostle St. Bartholomew in the mid-19th century as chapels were built nearby. 

The current Stepney parish church is St. Mary's Tyaskin, Maryland, about the same mid-19th century age and style and distance from this historic church as St. Philip's Episcopal Church in Quantico (deriving from a Native American word for "place of dancing"). Since Stepney parish extended up the Wicomico river watershed up the Delmarva Peninsula into what became Sussex County, Delaware, Stepney Parish helped found several other parishes, most of which began as chapels of ease. These included Spring Hill Church on Route 50 (built in 1776 and which arson recently burned down) in nearby Hebron, St. Peter's in Salisbury (founded 1758, burned down in 1860 and rebuilt), as well as Old Christ Church (Laurel, Delaware) (built in 1772, in wood but the same style as this building) and St. Luke's Protestant Episcopal Church (Seaford, Delaware) (built in 1843, incorporating St. Mary's congregation founded in 1704 but disestablished in the American Revolution).

Architecture
The single-story, Flemish bond gable-front brick church was built in 1733, as is shown in the restored brickwork on the end facing the water. The interior is spare, with box pews and several memorial plaques to long-serving rectors, as well as William Murray Stone who became Episcopal Bishop of Maryland. Adjacent to the church are several marked burials with 18th and 19th century stones, as well as agricultural fields and a golf course.

It was listed on the National Register of Historic Places in 1975.

The church no longer holds regular services. It is opened at least once a year in August for a St. Bartholomew's Day worship service held by several local Episcopal churches.  It is located on private property, with signs indicating CCTV monitoring the premises.

See also
 Old Christ Church (Laurel, Delaware), a "parish of ease" associated with the Green Hill Church, executed in wood rather than brick

References

External links

, including photo from 1996, at Maryland Historical Trust
 Historical Marker Database for Old Green Hill Church

Churches on the National Register of Historic Places in Maryland
Churches completed in 1733
Episcopal church buildings in Maryland
Churches in Wicomico County, Maryland
18th-century Episcopal church buildings
National Register of Historic Places in Wicomico County, Maryland